The Idoru is a post-hardcore band from Budapest, Hungary. It was formed in 2003 by ex-members of the Hungarian hard-core and metalcore band Newborn. The original line-up consisted of Tibor Szalkai (guitars), Gábor Nagy (guitars), Mátyás Mohácsi (bass), Denis Valach (drums) and András Bödecs (vocals). However, three of the original members (Bödecs, Szabó and Mohácsi) left the band in 2009.

The Idoru gained popularity with the success of their song "Monochrome" from the third studio album Monologue. The band has performed numerous events worldwide and was twice the winner of the national Hungarian Music Awards (Fonogram) for "Best Hard Rock/Metal Album of the Year" in 2010 and 2012, respectively.

History

2003-2005: Formation and Brand New Way, Brand New Situation 
The Idoru established in 2003 and started their career with local performances in Hungary. During the fall, they started the arrangement of their first studio material, which resulted in live appearance on New Year's Eve to present their first EP After The Storm. The three-song debut was the product of collaboration between The Idoru and a local Japanese label Alliance-Trax. Satisfied with the results, the label agreed to work on a full album.

The debut album Brand New Way, Brand New Situation was recorded in three month in late 2004. At that time, the band joined an uprising Austrian label Burning Season Records, and the full-length album was released in February 2005.

After recording their third work, Hopeless Illusions (EP), the band decided to leave Burning Season Records in order to join to Deadbutcher Records label, owned by the long-time good friend and supporter, Mikita. Their music becomes more mature and fulfilling, and melodic riffs along with quality vocals and emotional lyrics create unforgettable compositions.

2007-2012: Award winnings 
In 2007, the band releases their second album Monologue and joins Misfits on their European tour, as well as California band Ignite on a tour in Japan. Later that year, The Idoru performs in Russia.

The distinguished success comes in 2009, when the band records their third album Face The Light, which in 2010 wins the Hungarian Music Awards in the "Best Hard Rock/Metal Album of the Year" nomination. The Fonogram Awards are said to be the most remarkable appreciation in the Hungarian music sphere.

The fourth studio album of 2011, Time, blended the forces of metal, hardcore and punk rock genres, as well as acoustic songs. The material was recorded at SuperSize Recording, which is the most professional studio in Hungary. It is led by qualified experts, such as Zoli Varga, who has also been the producer for The Idoru band over the past several years. Time albums wins the prestige Fonogram Award for the band again in 2012.

2012-present: Pause and comeback 
Since 2012, the band was not very active. On 28 October 2016, The Idoru's song Refused Day by Day debuted on Rádió Rock 95.8.

Finally after a long hiatus, The Idoru emerged back with One Word single and Old Songs EP in 2020 and is planning a full-scale album for 2023.

Notable performances

2004: Headliner tour in Japan.

2005: Headliner tour in Europe.

2007: European tour with MISFITS.

2007: Japanese tour with Ignite.

2008: II European tour with MISFITS.

2009: Hungarian tour.

2011: The acoustic song "I'm Moving On", aired by a major Hungarian radio station Mr2 Petőfi, became #1 on the summer top-30 list.

2012: Hungarian tour.

Countries of performances

Austria | Belgium | Croatia | Czech Republic | France | Germany | Italy | Japan | Latvia | Lithuania | Netherlands | Poland | Romania | Russia | Serbia | Slovakia | Slovenia | Switzerland | Ukraine

Band members
Current members
 Tibor Szalkai – lead guitar (2003–2014, 2019–present)
 Gábor "Big" Nagy – guitar (2003–2014, 2019–present)
 András Bödecs – vocals (2003–2009, 2019–present)
 Mátyás Mohácsi – bass (2004–2009, 2019–present)
 László Szabó – drums (2004–2009, 2019–present)
Former members
 Máté Ács – bass (2003–2004)
 Ádám Fellegi – drums (2003–2004)
 Máté Kocsis – drums (2009–2014)
 József Szolga – vocals (2009–2014)
 Balázs Pásztóy – bass (2009–2013)
 Gergő Varga – bass (2013-2014)

Discography
Studio albums
 After The Storm (demo) (2003)
 Brand New Way, Brand New Situation (2004)
 Monologue (2007)
 Face The Light (2009)
 Time (2011)
 Time (Special Edition) (2012)

Singles and EPs
 Hopeless Illusions (EP) (2006)
 Modern Rock Split (EP) (2010)
 Old Songs (EP) (2020)

Awards
 2010 – The Fonogram Music Award for "Best Hard Rock/Metal Album of the Year", album Face The Light.
 2012 – The Fonogram Music Award for "Best Hard Rock/Metal Album of the Year", album Time.

References

External links
 Official Facebook page

Post-hardcore groups
Hungarian punk rock groups
Hungarian alternative rock groups
Musicians from Budapest
Musical groups established in 2003